Ebru may refer to:

Artform
Ebru is the contemporary Turkish word for what is called marbled paper in English.

People
Ebru Aydın (born 1973), Turkish singer and songwriter
Ebru Barutçu Gökdenizler (born 1959), Turkish diplomat and ambassador
Ebru Ceylan (born 1976), Turkish photographer, actress, screenwriter and art director.
Ebru Ceylan (volleyball) (born 1987), Turkish volleyball player
Ebru Destan (born 1977), Turkish singer, actress, and model
Ebru Elhan (born 1982), Turkish volleyball player
Ebru Gündeş (born 1974), Turkish pop-folk singer, actress, and television personality
Ebru Kavaklıoğlu (born 1970), Turkish long-distance runner
Ebru Şallı (born 1977), Turkish television personality, model and former pageant
Ebru Topçu (born 1996), Turkish football player
Ebru Umar (born 1970), Turkish-Dutch columnist
Ebru Yaşar (born 1977), Turkish pop-folk singer
Ebru Bolat (born 1999) Romanian sailor

Broadcasting
Ebru TV, a former English-language television network based in Turkey that was closed on July 19, 2016 by the Turkish government.[2]

See also
Paper marbling, a method of aqueous surface design, which can produce patterns similar to smooth marble or other kinds of stone

Turkish feminine given names